Nalwa is a village, as well as an Assembly Constituency in Haryana Legislative Assembly, located in Hisar district in the state of Haryana in India.

Nalwa village is the native village of O. P. Jindal, an industrialist. His son Naveen Jindal is the Ex Member of Parliament (In 14th and 15th Lok Sabha) from Kurukshetra, Haryana.

History
Nalwa, which means Tiger, was named after Sardar Balwant Singh Nalwa, who was the Deputy Commissioner of Hisar district during the British Raj, when Haryana was an integral part of undivided Punjab. Balwant Singh Nalwa was the fifth generation descendant of the famed Uppal Khatri Sikh General Sardar Hari Singh Nalwa.

Demographics

As per Census 2011 -
Nalwa is a large village located in Hisar, Haryana with total 845 families residing. The Nalwa village has population of 4665 of which 2457 are males while 2208 are females as per Population Census 2011.

People's living in the village are Hindu and Muslim. There are Kumhar, Jat, Brahmins, Dhanak, Chamar, Thakar, Maniyar(Hindu), Maniyar(Muslim), Yadav, Balmiki, Baniya, Khati, Nai, Dhobi, Chimpi, Sunar and some other castes.

Literacy rate
Nalwa village has lower literacy rate compared to Haryana. In 2011, literacy rate of Nalwa village was 69.24% compared to 75.55% of Haryana. In Nalwa Male literacy stands at 79.16% while female literacy rate was 58.20%.

Sex ratio
In Nalwa village population of children with age 0-6 is 657 which makes up 14.08% of total population of village. Average Sex Ratio of Nalwa village is 899 which is higher than Haryana state average of 879. Child Sex Ratio for the Nalwa as per census is 899, higher than Haryana average of 834.

Caste factor
Nalwa village of Hisar has substantial population of Scheduled Caste. Scheduled Caste (SC) constitutes 28.83% of total population in Nalwa village. The village Nalwa currently doesn't have any Scheduled Tribe (ST) population.

Transportation

Road
The village lies on State Highway (Major District Road 108). MDR 108 from Hisar to Bhiwani connects it to Tosham and other near by villages.

Bus service is the major means of transport in the village. Bus services are provided by Haryana Roadways and other private operators. Nalwa Bus Stand was established in 2016.

Nalwa is well-connected by the metalled asphalt (paved bitumen) road. List of the nearby city and villages away from the village→
Hisar 
Tosham 
Bhiwani 
Hansi 
Siwani 
Balawas 
Kanwari 
khanak 
New Delhi 
Chandigarh  via Hisar

Train connectivity
Nalwa does not have a rail station.

Airport connectivity
Currently, there are no commercial domestic or international flights from this airport.

Education
According to the data maintained by the Government of India's Department of Statistics, the Government College, Nalwa was established in 1985, Government ITI in 1980.

Nalwa Vidhan Sabha Constituency
Nalwa became a new Vidhan Sabha constituency of Legislative Assembly of Haryana (Hindi: हरियाणा विधान सभा) in the state of Haryana in the 2008 delimitation exercise. Earlier, most of the villages of this constituency were under Adampur, a stronghold of Bhajan Lal. Some of the villages were earlier with the Bawani Khera Constituency.

Geography
Mayapuri,  on the Nalwa-Tosham road forms a small part of Nalwa. Nalwa is a spiritual place with many temples.

References

Villages in Hisar district
Hisar district